Events in the year 2015 in Hungary.

Incumbents
President – János Áder 
Prime Minister – Viktor Orbán

Events

 April – Prime Minister Viktor Orbán calls for the return of the Death penalty in Hungary following the murder of a woman in southern Hungary.

Deaths

2 January – István Pásztor, cyclist (born 1926).
4 January – János Zsombolyai, cinematographer, film director and screenwriter (born 1939)
11 January – Jenő Buzánszky, football player and coach (born 1925).
16 February – Olga Törös, gymnast (born 1914).
21 April – Ferenc Konrád, water polo player (born 1945)
6 October – Árpád Göncz, writer, politician, President of Hungary (1990–2000) (born 1922)

See also
List of Hungarian films since 1990

References

 
Hungary
Hungary
Years of the 21st century in Hungary
2010s in Hungary